Fandango Latam, previously known as Cinepapaya, is a company selling movie tickets online and through mobile devices. It also provides showtime information and movie related content.

History 

Fandango Latam started as Cinepapaya in 2012, getting funding from 500 Startups and Telefonica‘s startup accelerator Wayra. It participated also in the Start-Up Chile’s acceleration program.

In 2014, Cinepapaya received a $2M investment from Brazilian internet conglomerate Movile. As of May 2015, Cinepapaya was transactional in Peru, Chile and Colombia, and served content in 17 countries in South America (as for May 2015), expecting to close 2015 with 20 countries, and then venture into other emerging markets.

In December 2016, Fandango Media purchased Cinepapaya, for an undisclosed amount. Fandango had previously acquired Cinepapaya's Brazilian competitor Ingresso in 2015, and merged the two entities to create Fandango Latam. In March 2017, Fandango announced a new branding strategy for its Latin American assets, and definitely switched its name from Cinepapaya to Fandango Latam.

In October 2017, Fandango acquired MovieTickets.com and gained more market shares in Latin America. In October 2018, Fandango Latam announced several multi-year deals with Cinépolis, Cinemark Theatres, National Amusements, and Cinemex, adding 5,000 new screens to Fandango s Latin American inventory. This deal turned Fandango into the largest online ticketer in Latin America.

Awards 

 2012: 2nd place in TNW Conference Latin America's Start-Up Battle
 2013: 1st place in Intel Challenge APEC.

References

Latam
Ticket sales companies
Companies of Peru
Internet properties established in 2012
2012 establishments in Peru